Ali el Mekdad (born 1961 in Maqne) is a Lebanese politician and an elected Shia member of the Lebanese parliament, representing the Baalbeck/Hermil district since 2009. He is part of the Hezbollah party parliamentary bloc.

See also
 Lebanese Parliament
 Members of the 2009-2013 Lebanese Parliament
 Hezbollah

References

Living people
Members of the Parliament of Lebanon
1961 births
Hezbollah politicians
People from Baalbek District
Lebanese neurologists